James Nicholas Verity-Amm (born 8 June 1994) is a South African rugby union player. He can play as a winger or full-back.

Rugby career

2013–2015: Youth and Varsity Shield rugby

Verity-Amm was born in Kroonstad, but grew up in the Western Cape, where he attended Hottentots Holland High School in Somerset West. In 2013, Verity-Amm made two appearances for the Cape Town-based  in the Under-19 Provincial Championship.

He scored four tries in seven appearances in 2014 – including two in a match against  – as UWC struggled in the competition, finishing second-bottom on the log. In 2015, Verity-Amm endured a purple patch, scoring hat-tricks in both of their matches against , and away to eventual runner-up , and two tries against , to finish as the competition's top scorer with eleven tries in seven starts.

2016–present: Western Force and Perth Spirit

In 2016, Verity-Amm moved to Perth in Australia, where he joined the Future Force, the academy of the Western Force Super Rugby franchise. He was named in the Perth Spirit squad for the 2016 National Rugby Championship, but failed to feature in any matches.

References

South African rugby union players
Living people
1994 births
People from Kroonstad
Rugby union wings
Rugby union fullbacks
Western Force players
Perth Spirit players
ACT Brumbies players
Griquas (rugby union) players
Bulls (rugby union) players
Blue Bulls players
Rugby union players from the Free State (province)